Man Alive! is the fourth studio album by English singer-songwriter Archy Marshall, and his third album under the stage name King Krule. The album was released on 21 February 2020 through True Panther Sounds, XL Recordings, and Matador Records.

The first single off the album, "(Don't Let the Dragon) Draag On" debuted on 14 January 2020 on Pitchfork.

Critical reception 

At Metacritic, which assigns a normalised rating out of 100 to reviews from mainstream critics, Man Alive! received an average score of 73, based on 19 reviews, indicating "generally favorable reviews".

Sam Moore of NME wrote that the album "is lifted by Marshall's knack for hazy social observations and poetic metropolitan storytelling", deeming it more accessible than The Ooz due to its condensed length and "more optimistic worldview". Niall Doherty of Q likewise found the sound of Man Alive! to be "more welcoming... not quite as warped as it once was", while adding that Marshall "sounds at peace here, and back to his best". Wilf Skinner of Clash praised the album as "an absorbing consolidation of Marshall's inimitable sound". "Holding to Marshall's wavelength requires a little more investment than the dingy music asks for, but that's not to say his shadowland of the heart lacks nuance," wrote Pitchfork critic Jazz Monroe, who was struck by "Marshall's intensity with words, the way he threads and knots them like jute rope to hoist himself out of psychic craters". AllMusic editor Andy Kellman highlighted Ignacio Salvadores' musical contributions: "They add necessary color to Marshall's gray vision, peculiar and riveting as it is on its own".

Entertainment Weeklys Leah Greenblatt was more qualified in her praise, finding the tracks "enveloping" but also occasionally "exhausting—a bleakness  that begs, eventually, for a little fresh air." Tom Sloman of DIY found that the "frustrating" album finds Marshall "in transition", while Greg Cochrane of Uncut wrote that "lush as it sometimes is, [it] too often disappears into an indecipherable cloud of smoke". Writing in The Guardian, critic Rachel Aroesti wrote that the album's "bagginess and unremitting gloom mean it often struggles to hold the attention and unfortunately lacks much discernible appeal at all." Tom Hull gave it a B grade and said that Marshall "has a rep for drawing on punk and hip-hop, but mostly comes up with Nick Cave dark tones".

Track listing 

Notes
 "Comet Face" contains elements from "Tramp", written by Jimmy McCracklin and Lowell Fulson; featuring samples from the Otis Redding and Carla Thomas recording.
 "Alone, Omen 3" contains portions of "Never Had a Dream", written by Leroy Bonner, Marshall Jones, Ralph Middlebrooks, Walter Morrison, Norman Napier, Andrew Nowland and Gregory Webster; performed by the Ohio Players.
 "Airport Antenatal Airplane" and "(Don't Let the Dragon) Draag On" contain elements of "Small Crimes", written, recorded and performed by Nilüfer Yanya.

Personnel
Musicians
 King Krule – performance, vocals, guitar, bass, synthesizers, keyboards, drum programming
 Ignacio Salvadores – backing vocals , saxophone 
 George Bass – drums , percussion 
 James Wilson – bass 
 Yassin – backing vocals 
 Jack Towell – vocoder 

Technical
 Archy Marshall – production, mixing
 Dilip Harris – production, mixing
 Guy Davie – mastering

Artwork
 Jack Marshall - Album Art

Charts

References

2020 albums
King Krule albums
Matador Records albums
True Panther Sounds albums
XL Recordings albums